Fan Duoyao (born 25 April 1997) is a Chinese luger who competes internationally.
 
He represented his country at the 2022 Winter Olympics.

References

External links
 
 
 

1997 births
Living people
Chinese male lugers
Olympic lugers of China
Lugers at the 2022 Winter Olympics
People from Hulunbuir
Sportspeople from Inner Mongolia